Mitchell Point is a point at the south side of the entrance to Hill Bay on the east coast of Brabant Island, in the Palmer Archipelago, Antarctica. It was photographed by Hunting Aerosurveys Ltd in 1956–57, and was mapped from these photos in 1959. The point was named by the UK Antarctic Place-Names Committee for American surgeon Silas W. Mitchell, the founder of neurology in the United States.

Maps
 Antarctic Digital Database (ADD). Scale 1:250000 topographic map of Antarctica. Scientific Committee on Antarctic Research (SCAR). Since 1993, regularly upgraded and updated.
British Antarctic Territory. Scale 1:200000 topographic map. DOS 610 Series, Sheet W 64 62. Directorate of Overseas Surveys, Tolworth, UK, 1980.
Brabant Island to Argentine Islands. Scale 1:250000 topographic map. British Antarctic Survey, 2008.

External links 
 Mitchell Point on USGS website
 Mitchell Point on SCAR website
 Mitchell Point Copernix satellite image

References

Headlands of the Palmer Archipelago